Bridal Cave is a cave located near Camdenton, Missouri, in the Lake of the Ozarks region. The cave is a mile long, but only a quarter of it is accessible to the public due to underground lakes. Its name is based on an Osage Native American myth found in R. G. Scott's Indian Romances.  

According to the book, Conwee, the son of an Osage chief, wanted to marry Wasena, the daughter of another Osage chief. Wasena did not want to marry him, so Conwee and his warriors kidnapped Wasena and her companion, Irona. The group tried to hide the women in the cave, but Wasena escaped and committed suicide to avoid being with Conwee. Irona did not try to escape as she was in love with Buffalo, Conwee's brother. She eventually married Buffalo in the same cave.  

The cave has been popular since the 1850s due to its speleothem formations and mineral coloring. The cave's opening was originally , and the cave itself had limited room for movement. Rooms and tunnels were expanded, and the first five rooms opened to the public in 1948 for tours. One of its well known rooms is the Bridal Chapel, which features the so-called pipe organ formation, which is a large stalactite and stalagmite fusion. Another known feature is Mystery Lake, which is a crystal-clear, 18-ft-deep lake that formed through drip water, as no underwater passage is seen. The lake has old wooden structures of unknown origins. Sampling the structures for dating purposes was not possible, since the structures started to dissolve when divers touched them.  

People can pay to host their own wedding in Bridal Cave. The first wedding was hosted in June 1949, and as of 2022, over 4,250 weddings have been held at Bridal Cave since then.

References

External links 
 Official site

Landforms of Camden County, Missouri
Caves of Missouri
Show caves in the United States
Tourist attractions in Camden County, Missouri